"Fast Lane" was the third single released in 2001 by American  R&B singer-songwriter Bilal, from his debut studio album, 1st Born Second. The song peaked at no. 41 on Billboards R&B Singles chart. The music video for the remix featuring Dr. Dre & Jadakiss was directed by Sanaa Hamri.

Track listing
US 12" Vinyl Single
"Fast Lane" (Radio Edit feat. - Dr. Dre & Jadakiss) – 3:59
"Fast Lane" (Main Mix feat. - Dr. Dre & Jadakiss) – 4:37
"Fast Lane" (Instrumental) – 3:53
"Fast Lane" (Acapella feat. - Dr. Dre & Jadakiss) – 4:28 
"Fast Lane" (W/O Rap) – 3:53

UK & Germany CD Single
 "Fast Lane" (Remix Main Version feat. - Dr. Dre & Jadakiss) – 4:12
 "How Come U Don't Call Me Anymore?" (Non - LP Track) – 3:46
 "Fast Lane" (Original Version) – 3:55
 "Fast Lane" (Video) – 4:03

UK CD Single
"Fast Lane" (Radio Edit feat. - Dr. Dre & Jadakiss) – 4:10
"Fast Lane" (Album Edit) – 3:53
"Fast Lane" (Instrumental) – 3:53

Charts

References

External links
 "Fast Lane (Remix)" (feat. Dr.Dre & Jadakiss) - single

2001 singles
Bilal (American singer) songs
Song recordings produced by Dr. Dre
Songs written by Mike City
2001 songs
Interscope Records singles
Songs written by Bilal (American singer)